Jitu  Soni (born 2 July 1969) is a Tanzanian CCM politician and Member of Parliament for Babati Rural constituency since 2010.

References

1969 births
Living people
Chama Cha Mapinduzi MPs
Tanzanian MPs 2010–2015
Arusha Meru Secondary School alumni
Popatlal Secondary School alumni
Tanzanian politicians of Indian descent